Proteocatella is a monotypic genus of bacteria in the family Peptostreptococcaceae. The only described species is Proteocatella sphenisci.

References

Monotypic bacteria genera
Peptostreptococcaceae
Bacteria described in 2009